Deftera may refer to:

 Kato Deftera, a village in Cyprus
 Pano Deftera, a village in Cyprus